The 2007–08 Indiana Hoosiers men's basketball team represented Indiana University during the 2007-08 NCAA Division I men's basketball season. Indiana was a member of the Big Ten Conference.  They played their home games in Assembly Hall in Bloomington, Indiana. The interim head coach at the end of the season was Dan Dakich. Indiana University announced on February 22, 2008, that Kelvin Sampson accepted a $750,000 buyout of his contract and resigned as the Indiana University men's basketball coach.

On March 10, 2008 D. J. White and Eric Gordon were named to the First Team All-Big Ten and Armon Bassett was named to the third team. White was also named the Conference player of the year. In the off season, starters Armon Bassett and Jamarcus Ellis were dismissed from the team after they failed to show up for a player meeting with coach Dakich, then failed to show up for a 6 a.m. run the following day.  In December 2008, Eric Gordon stated how the 2007–08 season was ruined by turmoil due to drug use among some players on the team.

Roster

Coaches: Kelvin Sampson, Jeff Meyer, Dan Dakich, Ray McCallum

Recruiting class

Schedule and Results

|-
!colspan=8| Big Ten tournament

|-
!colspan=8| NCAA tournament

See also
 Indiana Hoosiers men's basketball
 2007-08 Big Ten Conference men's basketball season
 2008 Big Ten Conference men's basketball tournament
 2008 NCAA Division I men's basketball tournament

References

Indiana
Indiana Hoosiers men's basketball seasons
Indiana
2007 in sports in Indiana
2008 in sports in Indiana